The 2017–18 season is Nottingham Forest's 152nd season in existence, 10th consecutive season in the EFL Championship, and their first full season under the ownership of Evangelos Marinakis and Sokratis Kominakis, who had purchased the club from Fawaz Al-Hasawi on 18 May 2017. In addition to the Championship, the club participated in the FA Cup and EFL Cup. The season covers the period between 1 July 2017 and 30 June 2018.

First team squad

New contracts

Player transfers

Transfers in

Loans in

Transfers out

Loans out

Pre-season friendlies
Nottingham Forest began their pre-season with a training camp at the IMG Academy in Florida, United States, between 3 and 14 July, which also included a training match against Deportivo Saprissa of Costa Rica. On their return to England, Forest played four friendlies within the borders of Nottinghamshire against city rivals Notts County, Mansfield Town, Girona and Burnley.

Forest's friendly against Notts County marked the inaugural game played for the Derek Pavis Trophy, named in honour of the former County chairman and Forest vice-chairman who had died in May 2017. Forest were awarded the trophy post-match after their 2–0 victory.

Competitions

Championship

League table

Result summary

Results by matchday

Matches

FA Cup
In the FA Cup, Forest entered the competition in the third round and were drawn at home to cup holders Arsenal.

EFL Cup
On 16 June 2017 Nottingham Forest were drawn at home to Shrewsbury Town in their opening game of the EFL Cup, also known for sponsorship reasons as the Carabao Cup. A trip to Premier League side Newcastle United was confirmed for the second round. Forest were drawn to play the reigning Premier League champions Chelsea away in the third round.

Season statistics

Appearances and goals

|}

Goal scorers

Disciplinary record

Awards

Club
Player of the Season

League
EFL Team of the Week

Sky Bet Goal of the Month

Cup
EFL Cup Team of the Round

References

Nottingham Forest
Nottingham Forest F.C. seasons